Colston is a  hamlet in the community of Puncheston in Pembrokeshire, Wales.

The hamlet is the site of a Neolithic chambered tomb, known as The Altar.  The tomb consists of a capstone, 2m by 2m by 0.6m, resting on two upright stones and set on a probable barrow, 30m in diameter.

References 

Villages in Pembrokeshire
Puncheston